These are paintings by the American artist Charles Marion Russell

Lists of paintings
Paintings